Jedrij Notz (born 6 September 1974) is an Azerbaijani alpine skier who competed at the 2010 Winter Olympics.

Notz was the best man to Christopher O'Neill when O'Neill married the Swedish princess Madeleine.

References 

1974 births
Living people
Azerbaijani male alpine skiers
Olympic alpine skiers of Azerbaijan
Alpine skiers at the 2010 Winter Olympics
Azerbaijani people of Swiss descent